Meri Aashiqui Tum Se Hi ( My love is only with you) is an Indian soap opera based on Emily Bronte's British novel Wuthering Heights and produced by Ekta Kapoor of Balaji Telefilms. The series aired from 24 June 2014 to 19 February 2016 on Colors TV and starred Shakti Arora and Radhika Madan.

Plot

Ishaani Joshi and Ranveer Vaghela have been childhood friends for twenty years as Ranveer's father Kailash is the driver of Ishaani's step-father Harshad Parekh. As they both grow up together, Ranveer loves Ishaani, but was hesitatant to confess it due to their parents' background difference, and thus remains only her best friend. Later they have a fallout and misunderstandings lead them to separate.

2 years later

Ranveer is a successful businessman engaged to Ritika Zaveri, the daughter of a wealthy jeweller. Ishaani's family is now poor, facing financial crisis due to Harshad's death. To save her family's dignity, Ranveer who still loves Ishaani, leaves Ritika and marries her. Later he is falsely accused for Chirag murder. However Ishaani takes the blame instead but by doing this she breaks Ranveer's trust.

6 months later

Ishaani is saved by Ranveer's friend, lawyer Shikhar Mehra who loves her. Ritika, posing as Ranveer's wife lives in Vaghela house. Ishaani gets shattered due to her mother Falguni's sudden death. As Ranveer learns the past truth he wants Ishaani back, who rejects him and decides to marry Shikhar. Ritika stabs Ishaani after revealing her true self that she killed Falguni. Ishaani recovers as Shikhar rescues her. Finally, Ritika gets exposed and jailed. Ranveer and Ishaani unite, clearing all misunderstandings.

It is revealed that Ranveer had a twin brother Milan whom Kailash gave up for adoption when they were in dire need of money after Ranveer had met with a serious accident during their childhood. Milan hates and vows to snatch everything from Ranveer. His motives are exposed later too as he commits suicide. Ritika is bailed and joins hands with Nirbhay Singh Ahlawat, who blames and wants revenge on Ranveer for his wife's death and sister Naina's paralysis.

Naina falls in love with Ranveer, who proves Nirbhay that he didn't kill his wife Pooja. Nirbhay apologizes to Ishaani and Ranveer. Ritika escapes. Ishaani and Ranveer finally unite.

Cast

Main
 Shakti Arora as 
 Ranveer Vaghela – Kailash and Amba's son; Milan's twin brother; Ishaani's husband; Ritika's former fiancé
 Milan Vaghela – Kailash and Amba's son; Ranveer's twin brother
 Radhika Madan as Ishaani Vaghela (nee:Joshi/Parekh)– Faalguni and Harshad's daughter; Nitin's biological daughter, Disha's half-sister; Ranveer's wife; Chirag's and Shikhar's former fiancée

Recurring
 Shahab Khan as Kailash Vaghela – Ranveer and Milan's father
 Utkarsha Naik as Amba Vaghela – Ranveer and Milan's mother
 Arjun Bijlani as Shikhar Mehra – Ishaani's former fiancé and best friend; Ritika and Ranveer's friend
 Smriti Khanna as Ritika Zaveri – Ranveer's former fiancé and Chirag secret girlfriend
 Mohit Abrol as Nirbhay Singh Ahlawat – Ranveer's enemy-turned-friend; Ritika's friend
 Ravjeet Singh as Chirag Mehta – Ishaani ex-fiancé and Ritika's ex-boyfriend and father of Ritika's unborn child
 Gauri Pradhan as Faalguni Parekh – Nitin's ex-wife; Harshad's wife; Ishaani and Disha's mother
 Prithvi Sankhala as Harshad Parekh – Maadhvi's brother; Faalguni's husband; Ishaani's adoptive father; Disha's father
 Hiten Tejwani as Nitin Joshi – Faalguni's ex-husband; Ishaani's father
 Maleeka Ghai as Maadhvi Parekh – Harshad's sister; Ishaani and Disha's aunt
 Tisha Kapoor as Disha Parekh Shah – Faalguni and Harshad's daughter; Ishaani's half-sister; Rishi's ex-fiancée; Manas's ex-wife; Krish's mother
 Anas Khan as Manas Shah – Disha's ex-husband; Krish's step-father
 Giriraj Kabra as Rishi Vyas – Disha's ex-fiancé; Krish's father
 Unknown as Krish Shah – Disha and Rishi's son; Manas's stepson
 Hardik Thakkar as Prateek Parekh – Ishaani's cousin
 Lankesh Bhardwaj as Police Inspector
 Deep Jaitely as Uttam
 Sunny Bajaj as Vikram
 Akanksha Juneja as Naina – Nirbhay's sister
 Parul Chauhan as Aarti Singh Ahlawat – Nirbhay and Naina's sister-in-law
 Dolly Sohi as Rajeshwari
 Gaurav Sarode as Shivam
 Gautam Gupta as Sharman Parekh – Ishaani's cousin, Ritika's ex-fiancé, Nimisha's boyfriend
 Aparna Dixit as Gauri – Ishaani's cousin
 Sarita Joshi as Hansa Parekh – Matriarch of the Parekh household
 Anmol Parnami as Devarsh Parekh – Ishaani's cousin; Sharman's brother
 Poonam Pandey as Krisha Parekh – Devarsh's wife; Shikhar's sister
 Nitin Vakharia as Mitesh Parekh –Ishaani and Disha's uncle; Harshad's brother; Sharman and Devarsh's father
 Manisha Kanojia/Roma Navani as Chaitali Parekh – Ishaani and Disha's aunt; Mitesh's wife; Sharman and Devarsh's mother
 Mihir Rajda as Manahar Parekh
 Amita Choksi as Vishaka Parekh
 Unknown as Ketan Mehta, Chirag and Nimisha's father
 Hetal Yadav as Shweta Ketan Mehta, Chirag and Nimisha's mother
 Pallavi Rao as Lakshmi – Amba's sister
 Parveen Kaur as Shikhar's aunt
 Lankesh Bhardwaj as Inspector 
 Urmila Nimbalkar / Charu Mehra as Paarul – Lakshmi's daughter; Ranveer's cousin
 Deepak Dutta as Raaj Mehra – Shikhar's father
 Sweetly Walia as Shikhar's aunt
 Deepali Kamath as Kanchan Mehra – Shikhar's mother
 Supriya Shailaja as Nimisha Mehta – Chirag's sister and Sharman's girlfriend
 Mohsin Khan as Roumil – Gauri's abusive husband
 Zaara Khan as Ruchika
 Priyanka Chandel as Shanela – Chirag's girlfriend
 Sanjay Gandhi as Sanjeev Zaveri – Ritika's father
 Abhay Bhargava as Advocate M.F. Purohit
 Priyanka Sidana as Garima
 Sahil Miglani as Bhavesh
 Rose Sardana as Shanaya
 Imran Hasnee as Rawal
 Neel Motwani as Pranav – Gauri's ex-lover
 Amit Tandon as Rajat
 Toral Rasputra as Anandi (guest)
 Mouni Roy as Shivanya (guest)
 Adaa Khan as Shesha (guest)

Awards and nominations

References

External links

Balaji Telefilms television series
2014 Indian television series debuts
Television shows based on British novels
2016 Indian television series endings
Colors TV original programming
Indian television series
Indian television soap operas
Serial drama television series
Television shows set in Mumbai